The Wohlen–Dietikon railway line is a railway line in Switzerland. It connects Wohlen and Bremgarten in the canton of Aargau with Dietikon in the canton of Zürich. Passenger service on the line now forms part of the Zürich S-Bahn, branded as the S17, and a frequent service is provided, with trains running up to every 15 minutes.

Whilst the earliest section to be opened, between Wohlen and Bremgarten, was built as a traditional standard gauge branch line, the later section between Bremgarten and Dietikon was built as rural electric tramway in metre gauge. Whilst much of the line has been upgraded, this is still apparent in the long stretches of roadside track, and stretches of street running in Dietikon.

Today the line is owned and operated by Aargau Verkehr AG (AVA), a company that operates other rail and bus services in the region.

History

Wohlen-Bremgarten railway
The route between Wohlen and Bremgarten West was built to standard gauge by the Aargauische Südbahn railway, which connected Aarau and Rotkreuz via Wohlen. The service began on 1 September 1876, operated by steam locomotives.

On 1 January 1902 Swiss Federal Railways (SBB) took over the Aargauische Südbahn. The SBB continued to operate the service as a steam operated standard gauge branch line.

Bremgarten-Dietikon tramway

The line to Wohlen had several disadvantages for Bremgarten. The timetable was poor, Bremgarten West station was too far away from the town centre, and the connection to Zürich initially proceeded in the wrong direction and was very indirect. In 1895 a plan was produced for a roadside electric tramway between Bremgarten and Dietikon. As Dietikon already had a direct rail link to Zürich, this provided a much more direct connection.

Construction began in 1901 and the route was opened on 30 April 1902. The new line crossed the Mutschellen pass between its two terminal points, was owned by the Bremgarten-Dietikon-Bahn company (BD), and built to metre gauge. The line's headquarters and terminus were at Bremgarten station, close to the town's centre. Besides the connection to the main line railway at Dietikon, the line shared track in Dietikon with the Limmattal-Strassenbahn, which provided a link to the Zürich city tram system.

Wohlen-Dietikon through service

Despite the construction of the new line, there was still a gap of about a kilometre between Bremgarten and Bremgarten West where passengers had to make their own way. The BD entered into negotiations with the SBB, and in 1910, a permanent lease for the Wohlen-Bremgarten railway line was obtained.

The standard gauge line from Wohlen to Bremgarten West was converted to dual gauge (standard and metre), thus permitting standard gauge freight to continue to access Bremgarten West, and was electrified. A new terminus was constructed opposite the main line station in Wohlen. In Bremgarten, a new stretch of metre gauge line was constructed to connect the two stations, including an imposing railway bridge across the river Reuss. Through running between Wohlen and Dietikon began on 8 February 1912.

Modernisation

After 1950 the line was modernised to suburban railway standards using new rolling stock and facilities. In 1969, the line took delivery of 9 new articulated BDe 8/8 units, which were to be the mainstay of the line for the next 40 years.

The opening of the rapid-transit Zürich S-Bahn network on 27 May 1990 caused major development. The route and timetable were integrated into the rapid-transit railway network, and three new stops with interchange facilities with other public transport modes were added.

In 1993, the line's rolling stock was augmented by 5 new Be 4/8 low-floor units. In 1995, a double-track section was built between Rudolfstetten Hofacker and Berikon-Widen, which was extended two years later to the  Belveder stop.

BDWM Transport
In 2000, the BD company merged with the  company (WM) to form BDWM Transport. Despite its name and by the time of the merger, the WM company was a bus operator, and BDWM Transport operated a number of bus services in addition to the Bremgarten–Dietikon line.

In 2010, the BDWM took delivery of the first of 14 new ABe 4/8 articulated low floor units, intended to replace all the previous units. The 40-year-old BDe 8/8 units were, with the exception of the preservation of a single unit, scrapped. The 17-year-old Be 4/8 units were sold to the Wynental and Suhrental Railway.

End of the standard gauge
The last standard gauge freight train operated to Bremgarten in 2009, although occasional standard gauge passenger trains aimed at the rail enthusiast market have run since. When track renewal was due in 2015, the decision was made to relay the line as meter gauge only. The end of the standard gauge was marked with special trains on June 26–28, and in July service between Bremgarten West and Wohlen was suspended for a number of days for the removal of the standard gauge track and renewal of the meter gauge track.

Aargau Verkehr
In June 2018, BDWM Transport merged with the Wynental and Suhrental Railway to form Aargau Verkehr AG (AVA), the company which now owns and operates the Bremgarten–Dietikon line.

Operation

Route

The Erdmannlistein stop lies in the middle in the forest and serves exclusively trip traffic. After 6.6 km, the Bremgarten West station is reached. This was originally the terminus of the old standard gauge branch railway whose route has been followed since Wohlen, and thus far the line is rather flat (maximum gradient of 1.5%), has gentle turning radii (minimum ) and resembles a normal SBB standard gauge line. After Bremgarten West, the line changes its character completely, adopting the sharper curves and steeper gradients of a narrow gauge line.

After negotiating two sharp curves out of Bremgarten West station, the line runs along the  bridge over the Reuss. From here on the line runs alongside the main road through a more densely populated, although still rural, area. From here the line drops through equally tortuous curves to Rudolfstetten Hofacker, where the downward gradient becomes gradually flatter. From Bergfrieden station the line has tramway-like characteristics with street-running.

Infrastructure

A section of  length in Dietikon runs in the street, sharing its road space with other traffic. The line is equipped with metre gauge ( gauge) track throughout, and is electrified at 1200 V DC, using an overhead line.

Services
 

The passenger services on the line now forms part of the Zürich S-Bahn, branded as the S17. A service of two trains per hour is provided every day between Wohlen and Dietikon. Except on Sundays and public holidays, an extra two trains per hour are provided between Bremgarten West and Dietikon. Apart from a small number of additional peak-hour express trains, all trains serve all stops, taking just over 30 minutes for the full length of the line.

Rolling stock 
The line uses the following rolling stock:

Future
There is a project for a light rail system in the densely populated Limmattal area, west of Zürich, which would connect to the Bremgarten–Dietikon in Dietikon. To the west of Dietikon the line would link to Spreitenbach and Killwangen, whilst to the east it would run through Urdorf and Schlieren to Zürich-Altstetten railway station, with connection to the Zürich tram route 2 (Verkehrsbetriebe Zürich) at the Farbhof terminus. A referendum, held in November 2015, approved the construction of the line, and it was announced in May 2016 that the line would be operated by BDWM. Construction is scheduled to start in late 2017, with a planned opening in 2022.

When completed, it is planned that the Limmattal light rail line would share tracks with the Bremgarten–Dietikon line, from the latter's terminus at Dietikon station to the intersection of Bremgartnerstrasse and Zentralstrasse. The common section of on-street track, which is currently single track, will be doubled.

References

External links

BDWM official web site

Aargau Verkehr railway lines
Dietikon
Metre gauge railways in Switzerland
Railway lines in Switzerland
Railway lines opened in 1876
Transport in Aargau
Transport in the canton of Zürich
Zürich S-Bahn lines
1200 V DC railway electrification